The Challenger in the America's Cup sailing competition is the team that challenges the defender to win the prestigious trophy.

Challengers 
Only seven times in America's Cup history has a challenger syndicate won the trophy.

See also
America's Cup
Defender (America's Cup)
List of America's Cup challengers and defenders

References

External links
 

America's Cup